A list of particle accelerators used for particle physics experiments. Some early particle accelerators that more properly did nuclear physics, but existed prior to the separation of particle physics from that field, are also included. Although a modern accelerator complex usually has several stages of accelerators, only accelerators whose output has been used directly for experiments are listed.

Early accelerators 

These all used single beams with fixed targets. They tended to have very briefly run, inexpensive, and unnamed experiments.

Cyclotrons 

[1] The magnetic pole pieces and return yoke from the 60-inch cyclotron were later moved to UC Davis and incorporated into a 76-inch isochronous cyclotron which is still in use today

Other early accelerator types

Synchrotrons

Fixed-target accelerators 

More modern accelerators that were also run in fixed target mode; often, they will also have been run as colliders, or accelerated particles for use in subsequently built colliders.

High intensity hadron accelerators (Meson and neutron sources)

Electron and low intensity hadron accelerators

Colliders

Electron–positron colliders

Hadron colliders

Electron-proton colliders

Light sources

Hypothetical accelerators 
Besides the real accelerators listed above, there are hypothetical accelerators often used
as hypothetical examples or optimistic projects by particle physicists.
 Eloisatron (Eurasiatic Long Intersecting Storage Accelerator) was a project of INFN headed by Antonio Zichichi at the Ettore Majorana Foundation and Centre for Scientific Culture in Erice, Sicily. The center-of-mass energy was planned to be 200 TeV, and the size was planned to span parts of Europe and Asia.
 Fermitron was an accelerator sketched by Enrico Fermi on a notepad in the 1940s proposing an accelerator in stable orbit around the Earth.
 The undulator radiation collider is a design for an accelerator with a center-of-mass energy around the GUT scale. It would be light-weeks across and require the construction of a Dyson swarm around the Sun.
 Planckatron is an accelerator with a center-of-mass energy of the order of the Planck scale. It is estimated that the radius of the Planckatron would have to be roughly the radius of the Milky Way. It would require so much energy to run that it could only be built by at least a Kardashev Type II civilization.
 Arguably also in this category falls the Zevatron, a hypothetical source for observed ultra-high-energy cosmic rays.

See also
 List of accelerator mass spectrometry facilities
 List of synchrotron radiation facilities

References

External links 
Judy Goldhaber. October 9, 1992. Bevalac Had 40-Year Record of Historic Discoveries
 High-energy collider parameters from the Particle Data Group
 Particle accelerators around the world
 Lawrence and his laboratory – a history of the early years of accelerator physics at Lawrence Berkeley Laboratory
 A brief history and review of accelerators (11 pgs, PDF file)
 SLAC beamlines over time
 Accelerators and detectors named Mark at SLAC
 Lawson, J. D. (1997), "Early British Synchrotrons, An Informal History", [accessed 17 May 2009]
 A FEW QUICK FACTS ABOUT THE TRIUMF CYCLOTRON

Accelerators in particle physics